Abolghasem Mozaffari Shams (born 2 July 1967 in Tehran) is an Iranian military person and engineer who is Head of Khatam al-Anbia in the Revolutionary Guard Corps since 7 August 2011.

He is a member of Sepah since April 1988. Before his appointment as head of Khatam Anbia Troops, he was head of Water and Power Development Company and Chairman of Tunnel Development Center.

References

1967 births
Living people
Islamic Revolutionary Guard Corps officers
People from Tehran